The Karmutzen Range is a small mountain range in British Columbia, Canada, located west of Nimpkish Lake on Vancouver Island, north of Tlakwa Creek and south and east of Karmuzten Creek. It has an area of 64 km2 and is a subrange of the Vancouver Island Ranges which in turn form part of the Insular Mountains.

See also
List of mountain ranges

References

External links
 

Vancouver Island Ranges